Sanj, Iran may refer to:
Sanj, Alborz, a village in Alborz Province, Iran
Sanj, Lorestan, a village in Lorestan Province, Iran
Sanj, Qazvin, a village in Qazvin Province, Iran